Red Flag Publishing House  or Hongqi Press (红旗出版社) is a book publisher based in China. It is a subsidiary company of Zhejiang Daily Press Group. Established in 1981, it is originally belonged to Qiushi Magazine and named after its predecessor Red Flag magazine, before its reconstruction in 2010. It mainly dedicated to political & economic publication, especially dealing with the construction and the political theories of Chinese Communist Party.

References

Book publishing companies of China
Mass media in Beijing
Chinese companies established in 1981